Alexandra Michel Orlando (born January 19, 1987) is a retired Canadian rhythmic gymnast. She represented Canada at the 2008 Olympic Games, the Commonwealth Games and Pan American Games.

Biography 
Orlando was born in Toronto, Ontario and attended Havergal College.  She trained at the Ritmika RG Club under Mimi Masleva, a native of Bulgaria.

Orlando won every rhythmic gymnastics event at the Canadian National Championships in 2003, 2004, 2005, 2006, and 2007. Orlando swept the individual event finals at the Elite Canada rhythmic gymnastics competition in 2007 and also won the all around crown. At the world championships in September, she finished ninth in the all-around competition and qualified for the Olympic Games in Beijing. She however only placed 18th in Beijing.

She won all six rhythmic gymnastics events included as part of the gymnastics program at the 2006 Commonwealth Games in Melbourne. She joined Graham Smith (1978, Edmonton), Susie O'Neill (1998, Kuala Lumpur) and Ian Thorpe (2002, Manchester) as the only competitors to win six gold medals at a single Commonwealth Games.

Orlando currently studies commerce at the University of Toronto. She is the subject of the book Alexandra Orlando: In Pursuit Of Victory (Toronto: BookLand Press, 2006) by Martin Avery.

Orlando is of Italian descent; her father is Sicilian and mother Salerno. She stated in an interview, "I went last summer for vacations for two weeks. I have many Italian relatives, my family is from the South. My mother is from Salerno, and my father is Sicilian. They all live there still, just my family lives in Canada."

References

External links
 
 
 
 
 
 

1987 births
Canadian people of Italian descent
Canadian rhythmic gymnasts
Commonwealth Games gold medallists for Canada
Gymnasts at the 2006 Commonwealth Games
Gymnasts at the 2003 Pan American Games
Gymnasts at the 2007 Pan American Games
Gymnasts at the 2008 Summer Olympics
Living people
Olympic gymnasts of Canada
Gymnasts from Toronto
Pan American Games gold medalists for Canada
Pan American Games silver medalists for Canada
Pan American Games bronze medalists for Canada
Commonwealth Games medallists in gymnastics
Pan American Games medalists in gymnastics
Havergal College alumni
Medalists at the 2003 Pan American Games
Medalists at the 2007 Pan American Games
20th-century Canadian women
21st-century Canadian women
Medallists at the 2006 Commonwealth Games